Armenfilm, also known as Hayfilm, is an Armenian film studio located in Yerevan. The studio was founded on 16 April 1923 as a production unit of the Soviet State Cinema Organization, with Daniel Dznuni as the first director.

Armenfilm was sold by the state to private investors in 2005 with a long list of conditions to revitalize the studio's equipment and produce new content. It was renamed as CS Film Studios but failed to produce the required new feature films. In 2015, the Government of Armenia decided that the new management had failed to satisfy the conditions of the sale and moved to reclaim the studio's assets.

History
1923 - The organization "Goskino" was created within the People's Commissariat of Education of Armenia, as well as the association "Gosfotokino."
1928 - The studio was renamed as "Armenkino."
1938 - The studio was renamed as "Yerevan Film Studio."
1957 - The studio was renamed as "Armenfilm."
1959 - The newsreel and television sector was reallocated to the independent Yerevan Studio of Documentary Films.
1966 - The studio was named after Hamo Beknazarian.
2005 - The film company was sold to the company "Armenia Studios" (part of the holding CS MEDIA CITY, which in turn is owned by members of the Armenian diaspora in the United States – the Cafesjian and Sarkisian families. The new owner committed to invest $66 million into the studio over 10 years.
2015 - The studio was reclaimed by the Government of Armenia

See also

 Armenian National Cinematheque
 Cinema of Armenia

References

Cinema of Armenia
Film production companies of the Soviet Union
Film studios
Mass media companies established in 1923
1923 establishments in the Soviet Union